Houlbec-Cocherel is a commune in the Eure department in Normandy in northern France. The town is located 80 km away from the capital and most populous city in France, Paris.

History
The Battle of Cocherel, an event of the Hundred Years' War that occurred on 16 May 1364.

Population

See also
Communes of the Eure department

References

Communes of Eure